Hemimyzon nujiangensis is a species of hillstream loach endemic to Yunnan, China.

References
 

N
Fish described in 1983